League table for teams participating in Ykkönen, the second tier of the Finnish Soccer League system, in 1988.

League table

Promotion replay: Jaro Pietarsaari - MyPa Anjalankoski  1-1 aet., 3-2 pen.
Relegation replay: VanPa Vantaa - GrIFK Kauniainen  3-0

Promotion/relegation playoff

KuPS Kuopio - MyPa Anjalankoski  2-1
MyPa Anjalankoski - KuPS Kuopio  2-2

KuPS Kuopio stayed in Premier Division.

See also
Mestaruussarja (Tier 1)

References

Ykkönen seasons
2
Fin
Fin